Ganoung Cobblestone Farmhouse is a historic home located at Lima in Livingston County, New York. It was constructed in the 1830s and is a vernacular two story, five bay cobblestone structure built in the late Federal / early Greek Revival style.  It features irregularly shaped, variously sized and colored cobbles in its construction.  Also on the property is a 19th-century carriage barn, small shed, and a well with pump.

It was listed on the National Register of Historic Places in 1989.

References

Houses on the National Register of Historic Places in New York (state)
Cobblestone architecture
Houses in Livingston County, New York
National Register of Historic Places in Livingston County, New York